Anton Kazakov (born 8 November 2004) is a Ukrainian professional snooker player.

Kazakov turned professional in 2022 after winning the WSF Junior Championship and gained a two-year tour card for the 2022–23 and 2023–24 snooker seasons.

Performance and rankings timeline

Career finals

Amateur finals: 2 (1 title)

References

External links
 Anton Kazakov at WPBSA snookerscores.net

2004 births
Living people
Ukrainian snooker players